Cheick Tidiane N'Diaye (born 15 February 1985) is a Senegalese professional footballer who plays as a goalkeeper for Stade Briochin.

Career
N'Diaye started his career with Olympique Noisy-le-Sec, a CFA2 (the fifth tier in the French football league system) club in the suburbs of Paris.

In 2005, he signed for Rennes. He has only made a single appearance for the Brittany club, in a Coupe de la Ligue tie with Montpellier.

After leaving Rennes in the summer of 2014, N'Diaye spent a year without a club before signing with Sedan in June 2015.

In June 2016, N'Diaye signed for fifth-tier side Stade Briochin.

References

External links

Cheick N'Diaye foot-national.com Profile

1985 births
Living people
Footballers from Dakar
Association football goalkeepers
Senegalese footballers
Senegal international footballers
2006 Africa Cup of Nations players
2008 Africa Cup of Nations players
Ligue 1 players
Championnat National players
Championnat National 2 players
Championnat National 3 players
Stade Rennais F.C. players
US Créteil-Lusitanos players
Olympique Noisy-le-Sec players
Paris FC players
CS Sedan Ardennes players
Stade Briochin players